

Season summary
1998–99 was a hugely successful season for Dynamo. As well as winning the double of the league title and national cup, they also reached the semi-finals of the Champions League. Dynamo's hopes of a treble were ultimately ended by a Bayern Munich side also chasing a treble.

Squad

First-team squad

Reserve and youth

Transfers

In

Out

Loaned out

Statistics

Appearances and goals

Top scorers

Includes all competitive matches

Coaching staff

Competitions

Overall

Ukrainian Premier League

League table

Pre-season

Results

Ukrainian Premier League

 Dynamo Kyiv-Karpaty Lviv 0-0
 Metalist Kharkiv-Dynamo Kyiv 1-6
 Dynamo Kyiv-Nyva Ternopil 1-0
 Shakhtar Donetsk-Dynamo Kyiv 1-2
 Dynamo Kyiv-Dnipro Dnipropetrovsk 2-3
 FC Zirka Kirovohrad-Dynamo Kyiv 0-5
 Dynamo Kyiv-Vorskla 4-0
 Dynamo Kyiv-Metalurh Zaporizhzhia 6-2
 Dynamo Kyiv-FC Spartak Ivano-Frankivsk 7-0
 Kryvbas-Dynamo Kyiv 0-0
 Dynamo Kyiv-Metalurh Donetsk 3-0
 SC Tavriya Simferopol-Dynamo Kyiv 3-3
 Dynamo Kyiv-MFK Mykolaiv 2-1
 Illichivets-Dynamo Kyiv 1-2
 Dynamo Kyiv-Arsenal Kyiv 2-0
 Arsenal Kyiv-Dynamo Kyiv 0-4
 Dynamo Kyiv-Illichivets 2-0
 MFK Mykolaiv-Dynamo Kyiv 0-4
 Dynamo Kyiv-SC Tavriya Simferopol 0-0
 Metalurh Donetsk-Dynamo Kyiv 1-4
 Dynamo Kyiv-Kryvbas 1-0
 FC Spartak Ivano-Frankivsk-Dynamo Kyiv 0-1
 Metalurh Zaporizhzhia-Dynamo Kyiv 1-3
 Vorskla-Dynamo Kyiv 0-2
 Dynamo Kyiv-FC Zirka Kirovohrad 1-0
 Dnipro Dnipropetrovsk-Dynamo Kyiv 0-1
 Dynamo Kyiv-Shakhtar Donetsk 0-0
 Nyva Ternopil-Dynamo Kyiv 1-5
 Dynamo Kyiv-Metalist Kharkiv 1-0
 Karpaty Lviv-Dynamo Kyiv 2-1

UEFA Champions League

 Dynamo won pk 3-1.

Ukrainian Cup

First round

 Odessa-Dynamo Kyiv 2-4
 Dynamo Kyiv-Odessa 4-0

Quarterfinals

 Metalist Kharkiv-Dynamo Kyiv 1-2
 Dynamo Kyiv-Metalist Kharkiv 3-0

Semifinals

 FC Zirka Kirovohrad-Dynamo Kyiv 1-5
 Dynamo Kyiv-FC Zirka Kirovohrad 1-0

Final

Match details

References

External links
Dynamo Kyiv Official Website

Dynamo Kyiv
FC Dynamo Kyiv seasons
Ukrainian football championship-winning seasons